Alex Mercer may refer to:

 Alex Mercer (Prototype), protagonist of the video game Prototype
 Alex Mercer (footballer) (1892–?), Scottish amateur football right half